Lucan Community Memorial Centre is an indoor, 1,600 seat arena located in the township of Lucan Biddulph in Ontario, Canada.  The main user of the arena is the Lucan Irish and Lucan Minor Hockey.  Along with the ice rink there is an auditorium, gymnasium and a small hall known as the Leprechaun Hall. On September 18, 2018, the arena hosted a pre-season National Hockey League game between the Toronto Maple Leafs and the Ottawa Senators.

References

Indoor arenas in Ontario
Indoor ice hockey venues in Canada
Sports venues in Ontario
Buildings and structures in Middlesex County, Ontario